Lambu may refer to:

 Mr. Lambu, a 1956 Indian Hindi-language film
 Goma Lambu (born 1984), Congolese footballer
 Lambu Nagesh (died 2017), Indian Kannada actor
 Ishant Sharma (born 1988), nicknamed "Lambu", Indian cricketer
 Lambu, a character in the Indian animated TV series Pakdam Pakdai